Noah Prince (born April 13, 1797 – February 14, 1872) was a Maine judge and politician who served as president of the Maine Senate from 1851 to 1852.

Born in Buckfield, Maine, Prince married Sarah Farrar, and their children included Charles H. Prince, who was later elected to the United States Congress.

References

1797 births
Maine state senators
1872 deaths
People from Buckfield, Maine
19th-century American politicians